Falcon Lair is an estate above Benedict Canyon in Bel Air, Los Angeles. The estate was built in 1925 by Rudolph Valentino, who named it Falcon Lair after his unproduced film, The Hooded Falcon. It is better known as a residence of heiress Doris Duke.

Valentino bought the four-acre estate in 1925 for US$175,000 and named it "Falcon Lair". He filled the house with antiques and memorabilia from his travels. Shortly after the purchase, he and Natacha Rambova divorced. Valentino retained Falcon Lair, hosted parties, and kept horses in his stable. After his death in 1926, it was auctioned off to settle his debts.

Carey Lays Ghost of Valentino Home;         Finds ‘Spirits’ Use Wires

From an interview with Harry Carey in Beverly Hills, Cal., Mar. 31. 1930. (AP).  The story was picked up by newspaper Evening Outlook that served Santa Monica, Ocean Park, Sawtelle, Pacific Palisades, Venice, Brentwood,Westwood.

The story’s opening paragraph is as follows: “The ghosts have been routed from filmland’s  most famous haunted house. No more will the spirit of Rudolph Valentino stalk through the spacious rooms of Falcon Lair, the palatial mansion he once occupied on a terrace overlooking Beverly Hills. No more will pale lights, weird moaning and sinister whispering flash and echo through the castle chambers where once the sheik held sway.”  

The interview goes on as follows. “ Harry Carey, screen actor, knew all about the spooks who were supposed to inhabit Falcon Lair, but upon his recent return from location in Africa, he had to find someplace for Mrs. Carey and their two children, and the Valentino estate was made to order. Over the protest of friends, he moved his family into Falcon Lair and his horses into the roomy Valentino stables. “Africa was wild” Carey said, “but our first night in Falcon Lair was one to turn your hair gray. Next morning we fix the windows and the banging ceased. We trace the howling to the wind blowing through the metal weather boards. We cut back the overgrown trees and shrubbery near the house, and other noises stopped. But night after night the tapping on the walls continued.” 

“One day by chance, I discovered a hidden door that apparently lead to a part of the basement. I opened the door and half a hundred bats rushed out that end of the tapping. but the weird very colored lights that once flashed from the windows!  

Hidden Wires

Exploring the basement through the hidden door, Carey said he found a large box containing a mass of electrical wires and switches. He treats these wires and found a lead up a chimney to a built-in bookcases in the room above. From the bookcase hidden wires ran to other parts of the house. Investigating further, Carey said he learned that shortly after Valentino’s death, a caretaker was hired to watch the property. He was a spiritualist, who with his followers held seances in the rooms where electrical terminals were found. During the census, Carey said he learned that the spirit of Valentino garbed in sheik raiment, was made to appear. From various electrical connections, pale blue and green mysteriously flashed on and off through the house. “ We seem to have solved the mystery.” Carey said. “ but when our lease is up, we are going back to the wide open spaces of a ranch. Sometimes I wake up in here new noises maybe the place is haunted.”  

After several owners, Doris Duke acquired the estate in the early 1950s to be with her companion, jazz musician Joe Castro, and to mingle with the Hollywood crowd. Falcon Lair became a venue for jazz concerts. Duke befriended Sharon Tate, her neighbor at Benedict Canyon. Eventually, she settled on a pattern where she would rotate her residence during the year, staying at Duke Farms and Rough Point during the summer, flying to Falcon Lair on her birthday, November 22 and spending the winter months at Shangri La in Hawaii. In 1993, after hip surgery, knee surgery, and a stroke, Doris Duke was kept in isolation—in a virtual "prison"—at Falcon Lair until her death. Thereafter, Bernard Lafferty, Duke's butler and initial executor of her will, renovated the bedroom for his own use.

Falcon Lair was sold by the Duke estate in 1998. A renovation project started in 2003 but was not completed; the property was offered for sale in 2006. The historic main building of the estate was bulldozed in 2006. In April 2009, the property was on the market for $7.95 million. Remaining at the property are the former stable building and three-bay garage, converted by Duke into a three-bedroom guesthouse and pool pavilion. In 2019 this house on 1.3 acres was listed for sale at $4.95 million. The additional 4-acres of the original estate has been approved for a 30,000-square-foot-plus house and was listed for sale in 2018 at $29.5 million.

Recordings 

1956: Zoot Sims with The Joe Castro Trio Live at Falcon Lair (Pablo Records)
1959: Teddy Edwards at Falcon's Lair with Joe Castro – split LP with Sonny Rollins' At Music Inn (MetroJazz Records)

References 
Citations

Bibliography

External links 
Virtual Globetrotting

Duke family residences
Culture of Hollywood, Los Angeles
Houses completed in 1925
Houses in Beverly Hills, California
Wallace Neff buildings
Buildings and structures demolished in 2006